Corridor 11 is the TransJakarta bus rapid transit route which operates from the Kampung Melayu Bus Terminal to the Pulo Gebang Bus Terminal. The streets through corridor 11 are the Sentra Primer Timur, Dr. Sumarno, Penggilingan, I Gusti Ngurah Rai, Bekasi Barat/Timur, Jatinegara Barat/Timur, and Matraman Raya streets. Starting from the Jatinegara 2 Station BRT Station to the Penggilingan Overpass, this BRT line is adjacent to the KRL Commuterline on the Cikarang Loop Line route and is integrated with the Commuterline at Jatinegara Station, Klender Station, Buaran Station, and Cakung Station.

Corridor 11 began its service on December 28, 2011, where it was inaugurated by the Governor of Jakarta at the time, Fauzi Bowo.

On April 15, 2022, to create a seamless integration between corridor 11 with other publc transportation services (such as the KRL Commuterline), the Stasiun Jatinegara 2 BRT Station as one of the stations on this corridor was closed for renovation to be directly connected to the Jatinegara railway station, along with 10 other BRT stations on corridor 1, 2, 5, and 9. The renovated Stasiun Jatinegara 2 BRT station was inaugurated on January 4, 2023.

List of BRT Stations 
 Station indicated by a -> sign has a one way service towards Kampung Melayu
 Corridor 11 will be temporarily extended to Matraman 1 from 7 January 2023 until the completion of renovated Kampung Melayu BRT station.
 Currently, bus stops from Pulogebang to Flyover Klender are served by buses 24 hours a day. Night corridor M11 diverge from its daytime counterpart by turning north from Flyover Klender toward Pulogadung.

Cross-corridor routes

Corridor 11V (Pulogebang–Pasar Baru) 
 Station indicated by a -> sign has a one way service towards Pasar Baru only.

Corridor 11T (Pulogebang–Stasiun Cakung) 
 Station indicated by a <- sign has a one way service towards Pulo Gebang only.

Fleets 

 Hino RK8 R260, blue (PPD)
 Hino RK8 R260, blue (BMP, night bus (22:00-05:00) (Pulo Gebang-Pulo Gadung (via Rawamangun))
 Mercedes-Benz buses OH 1526 NG, white-light blue (TJ, only operates at corridor 11V)
 Volvo B11R 6x2 A/T, white-blue (SAF)
 Scania K310IB 6x2, white-blue (MYS)

Depots 

 Cakung (PPD)
 Pulo Gadung (PPD)
 Klender (SAF)
 Klender (MYS)

Incidents 

 On October 9, 2013, the Buaran BRT station was burned by demonstrators who fighting againts a land execution on Buaran, East Jakarta. As the impact, Corridor 11 service was temporarily closed until the burned and damaged BRT station restored to its normal condition. Passengers were diverted to other transportation services.
 On 24 May 2017, two explosions occurred at the in Kampung Melayu BRT Station and bus terminal The Police confirmed that the explosions were caused by multiple explosive devices found in the toilet and in another part of the terminal. The bombings killed five people: three policemen and two attackers. The 11 injured people were taken to multiple hospitals across the Eastern Jakarta area.

See also 

 TransJakarta
 List of TransJakarta corridors

References

External links 
 

TransJakarta
Bus routes